Monte Vista may refer to

Places
 Monte Vista (Hong Kong), a private housing estate in Ma On Shan, Hong Kong
 Montevista, Davao de Oro, Philippines
 Monte Vista, Western Cape, South Africa

United States
 Monte Vista, California (disambiguation)
 Monte Vista, Placer County, California
 Monte Vista, Colorado, a city located in Rio Grande County
 Monte Vista Historic District, neighborhood in Midtown San Antonio, Texas
 Monte Vista National Wildlife Refuge, a National Wildlife Refuge in southern Colorado

Other uses
 Monte Vista (Middletown, Virginia), a house listed on the National Register of Historic Places
 Monte Vista (Philadelphia, Pennsylvania), an apartment complex listed on the National Register of Historic Places
 Monte Vista Christian School, in Watsonville, California, U.S.
 Monte Vista High School (disambiguation)
 Monte Vista Hotel (disambiguation)

See also